Nutfield is a village and civil parish in the Tandridge District of Surrey, England. It lies in the Weald immediately south of the Greensand Ridge and has a railway station at South Nutfield which is one stop from Redhill, on the Redhill to Tonbridge Line.  It includes a watersports park and picnic destination, Mercers Country Park.

History
The village lay within the Reigate hundred.

Nutfield appears in Domesday Book of 1086 as Notfelle.  It was held by Countess Ida of Boulogne (2nd wife of Count Eustace). Its domesday assets were: 3 hides; 1 church, 16 ploughs, 1 mill worth 2s,  of meadow, herbage worth 12 hogs. It rendered £15 per year to its feudal overlords.

At the end of the 12th century, Nutfield was held by Hubert de Anstey and his wife Dionysia, then in 1210 it passed to his son and heir Nicholas de Anstey.

The Grade II* listed St Peter and St Paul's church was built in the 13th century. The tower dates from the early 15th century but was partly rebuilt in the late 18th century. There are two stained glass windows by Edward Burne-Jones.

The Grade II listed Nutfield Priory, to the west of the village centre, was constructed by John Gibson in 1872–4.

Localities
The village centre stretches south from the A25 towards  station where the neighbourhood of Nutfield South has grown up, exceeding its parent village in size. North of the A25 is Nutfield Marsh. Also to the north of the A25 is Nutfield Court, a former country house that has been redeveloped into apartments, adjacent to St Peter & St Paul's church.

Governance
There is one representative on Surrey County Council, Chris Farr of the Independent group, for Godstone Division which includes Nutfield.

There are three representatives on Tandridge District Council:

The parish council has 8 members.

The parish council was set up in 1894 under the terms of the Local Government Act 1894. The council's work ranges from planning applications, allotments, cemetery, meeting and cultural venues, overgrown footpaths to dog fouling. The Metropolitan Green Belt has been used to retain the largely agricultural green belt around the village.

Transport
The village is served by Nutfield railway station on the Redhill–Tonbridge line which is located in South Nutfield, approximately 1 mile to the south of the village.

The village is served by the Metrobus route 400 and Southdown PSV route 410. These buses provide connections to Oxted, Caterham, Redhill, Gatwick Airport, Crawley and East Grinstead.

Amenities
Within the bounds of Nutfield is the Aqua Sports Company's Mercers Park country park.

Famous Inhabitants
Maria Louisa Charlesworth, popular author of religious books for children in the 1800s, lived at Church Hill House, Nutfield, and at The Cottage, where she died in 1861.  She was buried at St Peter & St Paul's Church.
Michael Maw (1912–1944), cricketer and Royal Air Force airman

Demography and housing

The average level of accommodation in the region composed of detached houses was 28%, the average that was apartments was 22.6%.

The proportion of households in the civil parish who owned their home outright compares to the regional average of 35.1%.  The proportion who owned their home with a loan compares to the regional average of 32.5%.  The remaining % is made up of rented dwellings (plus a negligible % of households living rent-free).

Nearest settlements

See also
List of places of worship in Tandridge (district)

References

Tandridge
Civil parishes in Surrey
Villages in Surrey